The Knox County Jail, located on the public square in Knoxville, is a former county jail used by Knox County, Illinois. Built in 1845, the jail was the second used in the county; it replaced a log jail which was thought to be insufficiently secure. Contractor Alvah Wheeler built the two-story brick building for $7,724. The county's only official hanging was conducted at the jail in 1873, when John M. Osborne was executed for the murder of Adelia Matthews; several hundred people came to watch his execution. Later in the same year, the county seat and the jail were both moved to Galesburg; the Knoxville jail is now part of the Knox County Museum.

The jail was added to the National Register of Historic Places on February 13, 1992.

References

Jails on the National Register of Historic Places in Illinois
Government buildings completed in 1845
Defunct prisons in Illinois
National Register of Historic Places in Knox County, Illinois
Jails in Illinois
1845 establishments in Illinois